Greystar Real Estate Partners is an international real estate developer and manager based in the United States. As of April 2019, Greystar had $32 billion in gross assets under management, and operated in nine countries in 2022.

Greystar was the largest apartment management company in the United States in 2021, with over 669,000 units of apartment infrastructure. The firm's business model is alleged to be adding to Ireland's housing crisis.

History
Founded in 1993 by chairman and CEO Bob Faith, and headquartered in Charleston, South Carolina, Greystar has over 14,000 employees, and 51 offices in the US, Europe, Latin America and Asia-Pacific region.

The company began operating in the UK in 2013. In July 2017, Greystar announced it would acquire Monogram Residential Trust's 14,000-unit portfolio of 49 rental communities in ten states, for $3 billion.

In June 2018, Greystar announced that it would acquire EdR, a manager of college housing communities in the US, for $4.6 billion.

In 2019, the company was sued for violating consumer protection laws. In a Los Angeles County Superior Court filing, Greystar was charged with gathering extensive personal identifying information about its tenants without their knowledge or consent. At five Greystar-owned apartment buildings, the company collected information about its tenants' "character" and "general reputation."

In 2022, Greystar operated in nine countries: China, France, Germany, Ireland, Mexico, the Netherlands, Spain, the United Kingdom, and the United States.

Notable buildings
Ascent Uptown, Charlotte, North Carolina, US
 Chapter Spitalfields, London, England (purchased by Greystar in 2015)

References

Companies based in Charleston, South Carolina
Financial services companies established in 1993
Real estate companies established in 1993
1993 establishments in South Carolina
Property management companies